Kvíčala (feminine: Kvíčalová) is a Czech surname. Notable people with the surname include:

 Jan Kvicala (1868–1939), Czech chess player
 Petr Kvíčala (born 1960), Czech painter
 Matěj Kvíčala (born 1989), Czech luger
 Michal Kvíčala (born 1981), Czech luger

See also
 
 29476 Kvíčala, a main-belt asteroid

Czech-language surnames